Barabanki is a constituency of the Uttar Pradesh Legislative Assembly covering the city of Barabanki in the Barabanki district of Uttar Pradesh, India.
  
Barabanki is one of five assembly constituencies in the Barabanki Lok Sabha constituency. Since 2008, this assembly constituency is numbered 268 amongst 403 constituencies.

According to data with the Election Commission of India, Barabanki Assembly constituency has 3,71,731 registered voters. It comprises 2,00,150 male and 1,71,581 female registered voters.

Election results

2022

2017
Samajwadi Party candidate Dharamraj Singh Yadav won in last Assembly election of 2017 Uttar Pradesh Legislative Elections defeating Bahujan Samaj Party candidate Suredra Singh by a margin of 29,704 votes. The voter turnout was 64.25%.

Sitting and previous MLAs
Below is the list of winners and runners-up in the Barabanki assembly elections conducted so far,

See also
Barabanki (disambiguation)

References

External links
 

Assembly constituencies of Uttar Pradesh
Barabanki, Uttar Pradesh